Mihai Razvan Bobocica (born 8 September 1986, in Craiova) is a Romanian-born Italian table tennis Olympian player who competed at the 2008 and 2012 Summer Olympics. From next season Mihai will represent table tennis club in Poland – Zooleszcz Gwiazda Bydgoszcz, As of December 2014, he is ranked no. 56, his best ranking.

Since 2011 Mihai Bobocica practices at the Werner Schlager Academy in Schwechat, Austria.

Bobocia qualified for the 2017 World Table Tennis Championships, then he was defeated in the first round, having been seeded against the No. 1 seed, and eventual winner, Ma Long.

References

External links
 
 

Sportspeople from Craiova
Italian people of Romanian descent
Romanian expatriates in Italy
Naturalised citizens of Italy
1986 births
Living people
Italian male table tennis players
Table tennis players at the 2008 Summer Olympics
Table tennis players at the 2012 Summer Olympics
Olympic table tennis players of Italy
European Games competitors for Italy
Table tennis players at the 2015 European Games
Mediterranean Games silver medalists for Italy
Competitors at the 2013 Mediterranean Games
Mediterranean Games medalists in table tennis
Table tennis players of Centro Sportivo Aeronautica Militare